Adnan Sezgin (born 28 January 1954) is a Turkish former professional footballer who serves Turkish football in various administrative positions.

Playing career
Born in Malatya, Turkey, Sezgin is a graduate of Ankara University in Political Science. A defender, he started his football career with Petrol Ofisi in the TFF First League. He later played for Ankaragücü and Adana Demirspor in the Süper Lig, before ending his career with San Jose Earthquakes in the United States.

Administrative career
After retiring from football, he founded Professional Footballers Association in Turkey and is the honorary president. He served in Turkish Football Federation as Secretary-General between 1990 and 1992. He was the president of İstanbulspor until 2004.

Sezgin served Galatasaray S.K. between 1992 and 1993 and 1996 and 1997 within Football Committee. Then in 2005, after Özhan Canaydın elected as Galatasaray president for one more term, Sezgin became the general manager of Galatasaray Sportif, the specialized marketing management company, to oversee marketing operations of the Galatasaray brand.

Personal life
Sezgin is fluent in English. He is married and has three children.

References

1954 births
Living people
Sportspeople from Malatya
Turkish footballers
MKE Ankaragücü footballers
Adana Demirspor footballers
San Jose Earthquakes (1974–1988) players
Turkish football chairmen and investors
Ankara University Faculty of Political Sciences alumni
Turkish businesspeople
North American Soccer League (1968–1984) players
Association football defenders